Gazzola (or ) is a comune (municipality) in the Province of Piacenza in the Italian region Emilia-Romagna, located about  northwest of Bologna and about  southwest of Piacenza.

Gazzola borders the following municipalities: Agazzano, Gossolengo, Gragnano Trebbiense, Piozzano, Rivergaro, Travo.

Demographic evolution

References

External links
Commune of Gazzola homepage
 Gazzola su The Campanile Project

Cities and towns in Emilia-Romagna